The xin zixing is a standardized form of Chinese character set in mainland China based on the 1964 "List of character forms of Common Chinese characters for Publishing" as compared to jiu zixing. The standard is based on regular script (Chinese: 楷書) and popular characters, and changes are made to the printed version of Song (Ming) typefaces. This standard not only covers the simplified characters, but also traditional characters, which makes it different from other standards. SimSun font that is pre-installed in Windows system uses this standard, which shows variation with other regional standards like MingLiU and KaiU of Taiwan, and even with the regular script version of SimKai which is the written version of character standard for China.

Standard Form of National Characters by Taiwan also made changes to the printed version of Ming (Song) typefaces, which varies greatly than the Table of common Chinese character in printing press and featuring drastic changes to the Ming typefaces, e.g. changing ⻍/辶 to ⻎. The usage of calling the Standard Form of National Characters as xin zixing is more notable in Traditional Chinese areas.

Characteristics
Note: Viewing this section correctly requires certain standard typefaces to be installed and the browser to be configured to use them in appropriate contexts.

The xin zixing has adopted various popular forms of its characters. For example:
 The orthodox form of this character has 君 above 羊, i.e. 羣.
 The orthodox form of this character has 山 above 夆, i.e. 峯.
 The orthodox form of this character has 亼 above 卩, i.e. .
 Derived new characters: , /, etc.
 Derived new characters: , /, etc.
However, it does adopt certain more orthodox variants, compared to the Taiwan and Hong Kong standards:

Standards
 List of character forms of Common Chinese characters for Publishing (1965) is the first version of xin zixing.
 List of General Used Characters in Modern Chinese (1988) defines the number of Chinese characters that should be used and the difference between Simplified and Traditional Chinese. The second version of xin zixing is defined in the appendix of Xiandai Hanyu Tongyong Zibiao and Xiandai Hanyu Changyong Zibiao.
 List of Generally Used Standardized Chinese characters (2013) defines the number of Chinese characters that should be used and the difference between Simplified and Traditional Chinese. The third version of xin zixing is defined in the appendix of List of Generally Used Standardized Chinese characters.

References

See also 

 jiu zixing
 Standard Form of National Characters

Chinese characters